Kirknewton may refer to:

Places
England
Kirknewton, Northumberland

Scotland
Kirknewton, West Lothian
RAF Kirknewton, a Royal Air Force station in West Lothian